Below is an episodic synopsis of The In-Laws, which consists of 35 episodes and broadcast on MediaCorp Channel 8.

Episodic Synopsis

See also
List of programmes broadcast by Mediacorp Channel 8
The In-Laws (TV series)

Lists of Singaporean television series episodes
Lists of soap opera episodes